Vidar Johansen (born 17 December 1951) is a Norwegian former ice hockey player. He was born in Asker, Norway and represented the club Frisk Asker. He played for the Norwegian national ice hockey team at the 1980 Winter Olympics.

References

External links

1951 births
Living people
Frisk Asker Ishockey players
Ice hockey players at the 1980 Winter Olympics
Norwegian ice hockey players
Olympic ice hockey players of Norway
People from Asker
Sportspeople from Viken (county)